School Begins is a 1928 Our Gang short silent comedy film directed by Anthony Mack. It was the 79th Our Gang short that was released and was considered to have been lost in the 1965 MGM vault fire. However, a copy is preserved in the Museum of Modern Art in New York.

Cast

The Gang
 Joe Cobb as Joe
 Jean Darling as Jean
 Allen Hoskins as Farina
 Bobby Hutchins as Wheezer
 Mary Ann Jackson as Mary Ann
 Harry Spear as Harry
 Jimmy Farren as Our Gang member
 Pete the Pup as Petie

Additional cast
 May Wallace as Harry's mother

See also
 Our Gang filmography

References

External links

1928 films
1928 comedy films
1928 short films
American silent short films
American black-and-white films
Films directed by Robert A. McGowan
Lost American films
Metro-Goldwyn-Mayer short films
Our Gang films
1920s American films
Silent American comedy films
1920s English-language films